Philip de Valognes, Lord of Ringwood, Benvie and Panmure was an Anglo-Norman Scottish noble. He was the Lord Chamberlain of Scotland between 1165–1171 and 1193–1214.

Philip was the fifth son of Roger de Valognes and Agnes filia John, came to Scotland around 1165, at the end of Malcolm IV's reign. He was the attendant of William the Lion and was one of the hostages for his release named in the Treaty of Falaise in 1174.

Valognes was captured by William Marshal during a tournament at Le Mans, Duchy of Maine, France in 1175 and was ransomed. He was granted the lands of Panmure, in Angus and Benvie in the Carse of Gowrie, and was appointed as Chamberlain of Scotland to William, serving from 1165 to c.1171 and from c.1193 to 1214. He continued in his role as Chamberlain on Alexander II's accession in 1214 and was succeeded by his son William on his death the following year.

He granted lands in Ringwood, Roxburghshire, to Melrose Abbey and an acre of land in Stinchandhaven to Coupar Angus Abbey. He died 5 November 1215 and was interred at Melrose Abbey.

Issue
William, married Lora de Quincy; had issue.
Sibilla, who married Robert de Stuteville; had issue.

Citations

References
 

 

Year of birth unknown
1215 deaths
Norman warriors
Scoto-Normans
Lord Chamberlains of Scotland
12th-century Scottish people
13th-century Scottish people
Burials at Melrose Abbey
Philip